Group 4 of the 1966 FIFA World Cup consisted of Chile, Soviet Union, Italy, and North Korea. Play began on 12 July 1966 and concluded on 20 July 1966. Soviet Union won the group and North Korea finished as runners-up on their World Cup debut, and both advanced to the quarter-finals. Italy and Chile failed to advance.

Standings

Matches

Soviet Union vs North Korea

|valign="top" width="50%"|

|}

Italy vs Chile

|valign="top" width="50%"|

|}

Chile vs North Korea

|valign="top" width="50%"|

|}

Soviet Union vs Italy

|valign="top" width="50%"|

|}

North Korea vs Italy

|valign="top" width="50%"|

|}

Soviet Union vs Chile

|valign="top" width="50%"|

|}

References

External links
 1966 FIFA World Cup archive

1966 FIFA World Cup
Italy at the 1966 FIFA World Cup
North Korea at the 1966 FIFA World Cup
Soviet Union at the 1966 FIFA World Cup
Chile at the 1966 FIFA World Cup